Mohammad Donyavi (1942 Sari, Iran - 1995 Sari, Iran) was an Iranian musician, vocalist and poet. He is considered one of the most influential traditional Mazandarani vocalists of his time. He started his music when he was very young. In 1958, he moved to Tehran and started his journalist career for Mazandarani press. He also collaborated with Mazandaran radio stations. Donyavi learned tonbak from Nasser Farhangfar and Mohammad Esmaili.

In 1970, he returned to Sari and continued producing programs for the local radio stations. During those years, he produced his famous works Golnesa, Biyamo Bahaar, Shoope, and many other. He also learned literature and poetry from Gholamreza Kabiri. Maziar and Kooch are some of his poems.
In his free time, he used to sing vocals on Molana and Mehdi Akhavan Sales's poems. He was working on Nima Yooshij's Mazandarani poems when he was diagnosed with cancer. In December 1994, a tribute ceremony was held for him in Radio Sari for his great influence on traditional Mazandarani music. Donyavi died of his illness in January 1995.

Some of his known works are:
 Golnesa
 Biyamo Bahaar
 Shupe

External links
 , "Mohammad Donyavi's short Biography is Farsi"

People from Sari, Iran
1942 births
1995 deaths